Parkhill railway station was a railway station in Parkhill, Aberdeenshire.

History
The station was opened on 18 July 1861 by the Formartine and Buchan Railway. To the north was the goods yard and at the north end was the signal box, which was called Parkhill box and it opened in 1920. This closed in 1925, being replaced by a ground frame. The station closed to passengers on 3 April 1950.

References

Sources
 
 

Disused railway stations in Aberdeenshire
Former Great North of Scotland Railway stations
Railway stations in Great Britain opened in 1861
Railway stations in Great Britain closed in 1950
1861 establishments in Scotland
1950 disestablishments in Scotland